In the 2011–12 season, USM Blida is competing in the Ligue 2 for the 19th season, as well as the Algerian Cup. They will be competing in Ligue 2, and the Algerian Cup.

Squad list
Players and squad numbers last updated on 30 April 2013Note: Flags indicate national team as has been defined under FIFA eligibility rules. Players may hold more than one non-FIFA nationality.

Competitions

Overview

{| class="wikitable" style="text-align: center"
|-
!rowspan=2|Competition
!colspan=8|Record
!rowspan=2|Started round
!rowspan=2|Final position / round
!rowspan=2|First match	
!rowspan=2|Last match
|-
!
!
!
!
!
!
!
!
|-
| Ligue 2

|  
| 5th
| 9 September 2011
| 27 April 2012
|-
| Algerian Cup

| 4th Round 
| Round of 64
| 11 November 2011
| 6 December 2011
|-
! Total

Ligue 1

League table

Results summary

Results by round

Matches

Algerian Cup

Squad information

Playing statistics

|-
! colspan=10 style=background:#dcdcdc; text-align:center| Goalkeepers

|-
! colspan=10 style=background:#dcdcdc; text-align:center| Defenders

|-
! colspan=10 style=background:#dcdcdc; text-align:center| Midfielders

 

|-
! colspan=10 style=background:#dcdcdc; text-align:center| Forwards

|-
! colspan=10 style=background:#dcdcdc; text-align:center| Players transferred out during the season

Goalscorers
Includes all competitive matches. The list is sorted alphabetically by surname when total goals are equal.

Clean sheets 
Includes all competitive matches.

Transfers

In

Out

References

External links
 2011–12 USM Blida season at dzfoot.com 

USM Blida seasons
Algerian football clubs 2011–12 season